The class 16 locomotives were built to work cross border services from Belgium. They are equipped to run in France, Netherlands and Germany. They have been displaced from these workings by Thalys electric multiple units and ended up working a few peak hour commuter trains until 2007 when they were withdrawn with two of them saved for preservation. When built they were classified as type 160.

External links 
 HLE 16 (ex type 160)

16
1500 V DC locomotives
3000 V DC locomotives
15 kV AC locomotives
25 kV AC locomotives
Electric locomotives of Belgium
Railway locomotives introduced in 1966
La Brugeoise et Nivelles locomotives
Standard gauge locomotives of Belgium